(1542–1620) was a Japanese samurai of the Watanabe clan, who served the Tokugawa clan. Born in Mikawa Province.  

He joined Ieyasu in 1557 and fought in such famous battles as the Battles of Anegawa (1570), Mikatagahara (1573) and Nagashino (1575).  He was nicknamed Yari no Hanzo (Spear Hanzo) because of his skill with the spear, but it was also to distinguish him from the Tokugawa samurai Hattori Hanzō who was called Oni no Hanzō he was a great hero.

Karō
Samurai
1542 births
1620 deaths
People from Okazaki, Aichi